Klęśnik  is a settlement in the administrative district of Gmina Szydłowo, within Piła County, Greater Poland Voivodeship, in west-central Poland.

References

Villages in Piła County